
Gmina Brańszczyk is a rural gmina (administrative district) in Wyszków County, Masovian Voivodeship, in east-central Poland.

Villages
Gmina Brańszczyk contains the villages and settlements of Białebłoto-Kobyla, Białebłoto-Kurza, Białebłoto-Nowa Wieś, Białebłoto-Stara Wieś, Brańszczyk, Budykierz, Dalekie-Tartak, Dudowizna, Knurowiec, Niemiry, Nowe Budy, Nowy Brańszczyk, Ojcowizna, Poręba Średnia, Poręba-Kocęby, Przyjmy, Stare Budy, Trzcianka, Tuchlin, Turzyn, Udrzyn and Udrzynek.

Neighbouring gminas
Gmina Brańszczyk is bordered by the gminas of Brok, Długosiodło, Łochów, Małkinia Górna, Ostrów Mazowiecka, Rząśnik, Sadowne and Wyszków.

References

Polish official population figures 2006

Branszczyk
Wyszków County